Roseboro or Rosboro may refer to:

People with the surname
 Brian C. Roseboro, an American banker
 Johnny Roseboro (1933–2002), a baseball player
 Viola Roseboro' (1857–1945), literary editor

Places in the United States
 Rosboro, Arkansas, an unincorporated community
 Roseboro, North Carolina, a town